Paul Conroy (born 4 June 1964) is a British freelance photographer and filmmaker who works in the British media. A former soldier with the Royal Artillery between 1980 and 1987, he has since worked extensively as a journalist in combat zones, producing footage from conflicts in the Balkans, the Middle East, and Libya. In 2011, he was shortlisted for the PRX Bayeux TV report along with Marie Colvin, a war correspondent with The Sunday Times.

Early life
Conroy was born on 4 June 1964 in Liverpool to Les Conroy and his wife Joan (née Mountain). He has two brothers and a sister.

2011-2012 Syrian uprising
On 22 February 2012 during the Syrian uprising, Conroy was injured while covering events from the Syrian city of Homs, a stronghold of Syrian opposition forces, after the building where he and other journalists were based was shelled by Syrian government forces. Marie Colvin and French photojournalist Remi Ochlik were killed in the attack, while Conroy was injured along with another journalist, French reporter Édith Bouvier of Le Figaro. 

Conroy suffered leg injuries in the attack and was subsequently smuggled out of the city and across the Syrian border to Lebanon. Avaaz coordinated the evacuation out of the city, but about twenty Syrian activists died during the evacuation operation.

French President Nicolas Sarkozy described the killing of Colvin and Ochlik as an assassination. It is believed that the journalists were targeted. The editor of The Sunday Times said he believed his reporter had been targeted. Conroy later described the situation in Homs as an "indiscriminate massacre" and "slaughter" and compared it to the destruction inflicted on Grozny during the Chechen Wars.

Conroy later wrote a book covering the events.

Personal life
Conroy married Katherine Joye "Kate" Baird in Fort William, Highland, Scotland in 1998. They have three sons together: Max (born 1992), Kim (born 1994) and Otto (born 2000
). He is a supporter of football club Liverpool F.C.

References

External link

1964 births
Living people
British male journalists
British photojournalists
British filmmakers
Photographers from Liverpool